The 2012 Filoil Flying V Preseason Hanes Cup is the seventh preseason high school and collegiate basketball tournament organized by Filoil Flying V Sports. The opening ceremonies was held on April 14, 2012 with the first tripleheader of basketball games at the Filoil Flying V Arena in San Juan. All eight teams from the University Athletic Association of the Philippines (UAAP) and ten from the National Collegiate Athletic Association (Philippines) (NCAA) participate in the tournament. Their junior counterparts also join the tournament, except for UE Junior Warriors.

Participants 
The tournament is composed of 18 teams, eight are from the UAAP and the remaining ten are from the NCAA. These squads are grouped into two, each consisting of nine teams. Meanwhile, their junior counterparts will also join the tournament, except for UE Junior Warriors, with Xavier School as the lone guest team for this division. The juniors' teams are grouped into three, each consisting of six teams.

Men's division

Juniors' division

Tournament format 
Due to different number of groups in men's and juniors' division, each has its own competition format.

Men's division 
The tournament format for men's division are as follows:
 During elimination round, teams will only play against teams in their group in a single round-robin schedule.
 At the end of the eliminations, the top four teams in each group will advance to the quarterfinal round.
 At the quarterfinals:
 Seeds #1 in group A meets #4 of group B (QF1)
 Seeds #2 in group B meets #3 of group A (QF2)
 Seeds #1 in group B meets #4 of group A (QF3)
 Seeds #2 in group A meets #3 of group B (QF4)
 Winner of QF1 meets winner of QF2 while QF3 winner meets QF4 winner in the semifinals.
 Winners of the semifinals will play for the Final round, while losers will battle for third place.
 The quotient system shall be applied in case of a tie in the standings between two or more teams.
 Only one foreign player shall play at a time in the court.

Juniors' division 
The tournament format for junior's division are as follows:
 During elimination round, teams will only play against teams in their group in a single round-robin schedule.
 The top six teams in overall standings, regardless of the group, will play for the quarterfinal round. The seeds #1 and #2 teams automatically advances to the semifinals.
 At the quarterfinals, team #3 meets #6 while #4 meets #5.
 At the semifinals, winners of the playoffs between #3 and #6 will face team #1, while #2 will play against the winner between #4 and #5.
 Winners of the semifinals will play for the Final round, while losers will battle for third place.
 The quotient system shall be applied in case of a tie in the standings between two or more teams.

Men's division

Elimination round

Group A

Team standings

Schedule

Results 

Number of asterisks (*) denotes the number of overtime periods.

Group B

Team standings

Schedule

Results 

Number of asterisks (*) denotes the number of overtime periods.

Bracket

Quarterfinals 
All times are local (UTC+8).

Semifinals 
All times are local (UTC+8).

Battle for third 
All times are local (UTC+8).

Final round 
All times are local (UTC+8).

Juniors' division

Elimination round

Group A

Team standings

Schedule

Results

Group B

Team standings

Schedule

Results 

* Number of asterisks (*) denotes the number of overtime periods.

Group C

Team standings

Schedule

Results

Bracket

Quarterfinals 
All times are local (UTC+8).

Semifinals 
All times are local (UTC+8).

Battle for third 
All times are local (UTC+8).

Final round 
All times are local (UTC+8).

See also 
 Shakey's V-League 9th Season 1st Conference

References

External links 
 
 Filoil Flying V 2012 Statistics

Filoil Flying V Preseason Premier Cup
2012 in Philippine sport